Kutushevo (Qotoş) is a rural locality (a village) in Meleuzovsky Selsoviet, Meleuzovsky District, Bashkortostan, Russia. The population was 490 as of 2010. There are 16 streets.

Geography 
Kutushevo is located 7 km north of Meleuz (the district's administrative centre) by road. Malomukachevo is the nearest rural locality.

References 

Rural localities in Meleuzovsky District